Arnside is a civil parish in the South Lakeland District of Cumbria, England.  It contains four listed buildings that are recorded in the National Heritage List for England.  Of these, one is listed at Grade II*, the middle of the three grades, and the others are at Grade II, the lowest grade.  The parish contains the village of Arnside and the surrounding countryside.  The listed buildings consist of a ruined tower house, which is also a scheduled monument, a farmhouse, a large house, and a signal box.


Key

Buildings

References

Citations

Sources

Lists of listed buildings in Cumbria
Listed